Limonium vulgare, called common sea-lavender, is a species of flowering plant in the genus Limonium native to Atlantic parts of Europe from southwestern Sweden to southwestern Iberia and the Azores, and introduced elsewhere. A clumping perennial found in salt marshes and other maritime habitats, it is a probable species complex.

References

vulgare
Plants described in 1768
Taxa named by Philip Miller